Igor Vitalyevich Palachyov (born 9 October 1973) is a former Russian professional footballer.

Club career
In 2003, he moved from FC KAMAZ to FC Dynamo Saint Petersburg.

Honours
 Russian Second Division Zone Ural top scorer: 2000 (36 goals).

References

External links
 

1973 births
Sportspeople from Bryansk
Living people
Soviet footballers
Russian footballers
PFC Krylia Sovetov Samara players
FC Lada-Tolyatti players
FC Chernomorets Novorossiysk players
Russian Premier League players
FC Ural Yekaterinburg players
FC KAMAZ Naberezhnye Chelny players
Association football forwards
FC Orenburg players
FC Dynamo Saint Petersburg players
FC Nosta Novotroitsk players
FC Spartak Nizhny Novgorod players